Mahesh Bhupathi and Michaël Llodra were the defending champions, but Llodra chose not to participate. Bhupathi played alongside Denis Istomin, but they lost in the quarterfinals to Rohan Bopanna and Aisam-ul-Haq Qureshi. 
Bopanna and Qureshi went on to win the title, defeating Daniel Nestor and Nenad Zimonjić in the final, 6–4, 6–3.

Seeds

Draw

Draw

Qualifying

Seeds

Qualifiers
  Nikolay Davydenko /  Victor Hănescu

Qualifying draw

References
 Main Draw

Dubai Tennis Championships - Doubles
2014 Men's Doubles